The 2011 China Masters Super Series was the seventh super series tournament of the 2011 BWF Super Series. The tournament was held in Changzhou, China from September 13–18, 2011 and had a total purse of $200,000.

Men's singles

Seeds

  Lin Dan
  Peter Gade
  Chen Long
  Chen Jin
  Du Pengyu
  Sho Sasaki
  Bao Chunlai
  Lee Hyun-il

Top half

Bottom half

Finals

Women's singles

Seeds

  Wang Yihan
  Wang Shixian
  Wang Xin
  Jiang Yanjiao
  Saina Nehwal
  Tine Baun
  Liu Xin
  Cheng Shao-chieh

Top half

Bottom half

Finals

Men's doubles

Seeds

  Cai Yun / Fu Haifeng
  Mathias Boe / Carsten Mogensen
  Jung Jae-sung / Lee Yong-dae
  Ko Sung-hyun / Yoo Yeon-seong
  Koo Kien Keat / Tan Boon Heong
  Muhammad Ahsan / Bona Septano
  Markis Kido / Hendra Setiawan
  Alvent Yulianto Chandra / Hendra Aprida Gunawan

Top half

Bottom half

Finals

Women's doubles

Seeds

  Wang Xiaoli / Yu Yang
  Miyuki Maeda / Satoko Suetsuna
  Mizuki Fujii / Reika Kakiiwa
  Tian Qing / Zhao Yunlei
  Cheng Wen-hsing / Chien Yu-chin
  Shizuka Matsuo / Mami Naito
  Ha Jung-eun / Kim Min-jung
  Cheng Shu / Pan Pan

Top half

Bottom half

Finals

Mixed doubles

Seeds

  Zhang Nan / Zhao Yunlei
  Tao Jiaming / Tian Qing
  Joachim Fischer Nielsen / Christinna Pedersen
  Chen Hung-ling / Cheng Wen-hsing
  Xu Chen / Ma Jin
  Nathan Robertson / Jenny Wallwork
  Robert Mateusiak / Nadiezda Zieba
  Thomas Laybourn / Kamilla Rytter Juhl

Top half

Bottom half

Finals

References 

2011 China Masters Super Series
China Masters Super Series
Chinese Masters